Töregene Khatun (also Turakina) (d. 1246) was the Great Khatun and regent of the Mongol Empire from the death of her husband Ögedei Khan in 1241 until the election of her eldest son Güyük Khan in 1246.

Background 

Töregene was born into the Naiman tribe. Her first husband was a member of the Merkit clan. Some sources state that his name was Qudu (d. 1217), son of Toqto'a Beki of the Merkits. However, Rashid-al-Din Hamadani named her first husband as Dayir Usun of the Merkits. When Genghis conquered the Merkits in 1204, he gave Töregene to Ögedei as his second wife. While Ögedei's first wife Boraqchin had no sons, Töregene gave birth to five sons, Güyük, Kötän, Köchü, Qarachar, and Qashi (father of Kaidu).

She eclipsed all of Ögedei's wives and gradually increased her influence among the court officials. But Töregene still resented Ögedei's officials and the policy of centralizing the administration and lowering tax burdens. Töregene sponsored the reprinting of the Taoist canon in North China. Through the influence of Töregene, Ögedei appointed Abd-ur-Rahman as tax farmer in China.

Great Khatun of the Mongol Empire

Soon after Ögedei died in 1241, at first power passed to the hands of Möge Khatun, one of Ögedei's widows and formerly one of Genghis Khan's wives. With the support of Chagatai and her sons, Töregene assumed complete power as regent in spring 1242 as Great Khatun and dismissed her late husband's ministers and replaced them with her own, the most important of whom was another woman, Fatima, a Tajik or Persian captive from the Middle Eastern campaign. She was a Shiite Muslim who was deported from the city of Meshed to Mongolia.

She tried to arrest several of Ögedei's main officials. Her husband's chief secretary, Chinqai, and the administrator, Mahmud Yalavach fled to her son Koden in North China while Turkestani administrator Masud Begh, fled to Batu Khan in Pontic Steppe. In Iran Töregene ordered Korguz arrested and handed over to the widow of Chagatai, whom he had defied. The Chagatayid Khan Qara Hülëgü executed him. Töregene appointed Arghun Aqa of the Oirat as governor in Persia.

She put Abd-ur-Rahman in charge of general administration in North China and Fatima became even more powerful at the Mongol court. These actions led the Mongol aristocrats into a frenzy of extortionate demands for revenue.

Role in Mongol conquests

Töregene had friendly relations with Ögedei's commanders in China. The conflicts between the Mongols and the Song troops took place in the areas of Chengdu. Töregene sent her envoys to negotiate peace, but Song imprisoned them. The Mongols captured Hangzhou and invaded Sichuan in 1242. She ordered Zhang Rou and Chagaan (Tsagaan) to attack the Song Dynasty. When they pillaged the Song territory, the Song court sent a delegation to ceasefire. Chagaan and Zhang Rou returned north after the Mongols accepted the term.

During the reign of Ögedei, the Seljuks of Rum offered friendship and a modest tribute to Chormaqan. Under Kaykhusraw II, however, the Mongols began to pressure the Sultan to go to Mongolia in person, give hostages, and accept a Mongol darughachi. Mongol raids began in 1240. The Seljuk Sultan Kaykhusraw assembled a large army to meet them. The king of Cilician Armenia was required to produce 1400 lances and the Greek Emperor of Nicaea 400 lances. Both rulers met the sultan in Kayseri to negotiate details. The Grand Komnenos of Trebizond contributed 200, while the young Ayyubid prince of Aleppo supplied 1000 horsemen. In addition to these, Kaykhusraw commanded the Seljuq army and irregular Turkmen cavalry, though both had been weakened by the Baba Ishak rebellion. However, Baiju and his Georgian auxiliaries crushed them at the battle of Köse Dağ in 1243. After that battle, the Sultanate of Rum, the Empire of Trebizond and the Lesser Armenia quickly declared their allegiance one by one to the Mongol Empire ruled by Töregene Khatun.

The Mongol troops under general Baiju probed the forces of Abbasid Iraq and Ayubid ruled Syria in 1244–46.

Güyük's coronation

She was an exercise of power in a society that was traditionally led only by men. She managed to balance the various competing powers within the empire, and even within the extended family of the descendants of Genghis Khan, over a 5-year period in which she not only ruled the empire, but set the stage for the ascension of her son Güyük as Great Khan. During Töregene's reign, foreign dignitaries arrived from the distant corners of the empire to her capital at Karakorum or to her nomadic imperial camp. The Seljuk sultan came from Turkey—as did representatives of the Caliph of Abbasid in Baghdad. So did two claimants to the throne of Georgia: David Ulu, the illegitimate son of the late king—and David Narin, the legitimate son of the same king. The highest-ranking European delegate was Alexander Nevsky's father, Grand Prince Yaroslav Vsevolodovich of Vladimir and Suzdal, who died suspiciously just after dining with Töregene Khatun.

The Mongols practiced polygamy. Ögedei Khan's favorite son was Kochu, who was his through another wife, and he had nominated Kochu's son Siremun to succeed him after his father suddenly died in China in 1237. But some sources mention that Khoch was a son of Töregene and she did not want little Shiremun to succeed. Töregene opposed the choice in favor of Güyük, but despite the enormous influence she had on him, she was unable to persuade Ögedei to change his selection. She did, however, achieve her aims through cunning. When the lesser khans appointed her regent after her husband's death, she appointed her favorites to high positions in the imperial household and initiated what was to be a successful scheme to elevate her son Güyük. When Temüge Otchigen, the youngest brother of Genghis, gathered his men and tried to unsuccessfully seize the throne, Güyük quickly came to meet him. Töregene managed to keep a Kurultai from being held until it was sure her son Güyük was favored by the majority. Töregene passed power onto her son Güyük in 1246. She retired west to Ögedei's appanage on the Emil.

Despite her role in ensuring Güyük's election as Khagan, the relationship between Töregene and her son eventually collapsed. Güyük's brother Koden accused Fatima of using witchcraft to damage his health; when Koden died a few months later, Güyük insisted that his mother hand Fatima over for execution. Töregene threatened her son Güyük that she would commit suicide to spite him. Güyük's men seized Fatima and put her to death by sewing up all of her orifices and dumping her into water; Töregene's supporters in the imperial household were simultaneously purged. Within 18 months of Fatima's death, Töregene herself died under still unexplained circumstances. She was posthumously renamed Empress Zhaoci by Kublai in 1265-1266.

In popular media

She was portrayed by Cai Wenyan in The Legend of Kublai Khan (2013)

References

Citations

Sources

Jack Weatherford – The Women Who Ruled the Mongol Empire (dead link)
Jack Weatherford. The Secret History of the Mongol Queens: How the Daughters of Genghis Khan Rescued His Empire (Crown; 2010).

1246 deaths
13th-century Mongol rulers
Mongol empresses
Year of birth missing
13th-century viceregal rulers
13th-century women rulers
House of Ögedei
13th-century Mongolian women